Aster or ASTER may refer to:

Biology
 Aster (genus), a genus of flowering plants
 List of Aster synonyms, other genera formerly included in Aster and still called asters in English
 Aster (cell biology), a cellular structure shaped like a star, formed around each centrosome during mitosis
 Aster, a star-shaped sponge spicule

Automobiles
 Ateliers de Construction Mecanique l'Aster, a French automobile and engine manufacturer from 1900 to 1910
 Aster Società Italiana Motori, an Italian automobile manufacturer from 1906 to 1908
 Aster (automobile), a British automobile manufactured between 1922 and 1930

Military
 Aster (missile family), a family of Surface to Air Missiles, produced jointly by France, Great Britain, and Italy
 USS Aster, a Civil War Union Navy tugboat
 , two Royal Navy ships
 Belgian minehunter Aster (M915), ship
 Operation Aster, by the Soviet Army in 1944 in Estonia

Businesses
 Aster (venture capital company)
 Aster Data Systems, an American data management and analysis software company
 Aster DM Healthcare, an Indian health care provider

Fictional characters
 Aster Laker, a supporting character from the game Tales of Symphonia: Dawn of the New World
 Aster Phoenix, from the Japanese anime Yu-Gi-Oh! GX
 E. Aster Bunnymund, a re-imagining of the Easter Bunny in the 2012 animated film Rise of the Guardians
 Molly Aster, from the Peter Pan series
 Sajit Aster, from the Japanese manga Waltz in a White Dress
 Neve, Gliz and Aster, official mascots of the 2006 Winter Paralympics

People
 Aster (name), a list of people with either the given name or surname
 Aster Berkhof, a pen name of Belgian writer Lodewijk Paulina Van Den Bergh (1920–2020)
 Jack Aster, newspaper pen name of Walter Russell Crampton (1877–1938), Australian trade unionist, journalist and politician

Places
 Aster, Edmonton, a neighbourhood in Canada
 Aster Glacier, Antarctica
 1218 Aster, a main-belt asteroid

Other uses
 Aster (typeface), a serif-class of typeface
 ASTER (sensor), a Japanese sensor on board the Terra satellite
 ASTER (spacecraft), a 2021 spacecraft mission by Brazil
 Aster CT-80, a 1982 Dutch home computer
 Aster MIMS, a hospital in Kozhikode, India

See also 
 
 
 Aster Revolution, in Hungary in 1918
 Astor (disambiguation)
 Asterism (disambiguation)